Ouvrage Col de Crous is a lesser work (petit ouvrage) of the Maginot Line's Alpine extension, the Alpine Line. Additional blocks were planned but not built.

Description

Block 1 (incomplete).
Block 2 (not built).
Block 3 (incomplete).
Block 4 (infantry): two machine gun embrasures.

Two proposed petits ouvrages were proposed for the same ridge to the north, the Ouvrage du Col-de-Pal and the ''Ouvrage du col-de-Jallorgues, neither of which were started.

See also
 List of Alpine Line ouvrages

References

Bibliography 
Allcorn, William. The Maginot Line 1928–45. Oxford: Osprey Publishing, 2003. 
Kaufmann, J.E. and Kaufmann, H.W. Fortress France: The Maginot Line and French Defenses in World War II, Stackpole Books, 2006. 
Mary, Jean-Yves; Hohnadel, Alain; Sicard, Jacques. Hommes et Ouvrages de la Ligne Maginot, Tome 1. Paris, Histoire & Collections, 2001.  
Mary, Jean-Yves; Hohnadel, Alain; Sicard, Jacques. Hommes et Ouvrages de la Ligne Maginot, Tome 4 - La fortification alpine. Paris, Histoire & Collections, 2009.  
Mary, Jean-Yves; Hohnadel, Alain; Sicard, Jacques. Hommes et Ouvrages de la Ligne Maginot, Tome 5. Paris, Histoire & Collections, 2009.

External links 
 Col de Crous (petit ouvrage du) at fortiff.be 
 

COLC
Maginot Line
Alpine Line